Miss Thailand Universe 2002 was the 3rd Miss Thailand Universe pageant, held at Sofitel Centara Grand Bangkok in Bangkok on March 23, 2002. The 44 contestants arrived in Nakhon Pathom a week prior to participate in activities and returned to Bangkok to compete in the final round.

In the final round, broadcast live on BBTV Channel 7, Janjira Janchome, was crowned Miss Thailand Universe 2002 by Varinthorn Phadoongvithee, Miss Thailand Universe 2001.

Janjira Janchome represented Thailand in Miss Universe 2002 pageant in San Juan, Puerto Rico.

Results
Color keys

The winner and two runner-up were awarded to participate internationally (two title from the Big Four international beauty pageants and one minor international beauty pageants) positions were given in the following order:

Placements

Delegates
44 contestants competed for the title of Miss Thailand Universe 2002.

References

External links 
 
 
 Thaimiss.com

2002 in Bangkok
2002 beauty pageants
March 2002 events in Thailand
2002
Beauty pageants in Thailand